Chthonerpeton arii is a species of amphibian in the family Typhlonectidae. It is endemic to Brazil. Its natural habitats are dry savanna, rivers, intermittent rivers, freshwater marshes, intermittent freshwater marshes, pastureland, irrigated land, seasonally flooded agricultural land, and canals and ditches.

References

arii
Endemic fauna of Brazil
Amphibians described in 1994
Taxonomy articles created by Polbot